Polyakov or Poliakov, , or Polyakova, Paliakova (feminine) is a Slavic surname. It may be transliterated as Poliakoff. Notable people with the surname include:

 Aleksei Poliakov (born 1974), Russian/Uzbek goalkeeper
 Alexander Polyakov (disambiguation), multiple individuals
 Alla Polyakova (born 1970), Russian politician
 Anatoly Polyakov (born 1980), Russian swimmer
 Andrei Polyakov (1950–2021), Russian diplomat
 Dmitri Polyakov (1921–1988), Soviet General and a spy for the CIA
 Dzyanis Palyakow (born 1991), Belarusian footballer
 Elena Polyakova (born 1981), Russian ultramarathon runner
 Ella Polyakova (born 1941), Russian human rights activist
 Grigory Polyakov (1876–1939), Russian ornithologist
 Igor Polyakov (1912–2008), Soviet rower
 Ivan Alexeyevich Polyakov (1886–1969), Russian Cossack military leader
 Ivan Jaŭcejavič Paliakoŭ (1914–2004), Belarusan politician
 Lazar Polyakov (1843–1914), Russian entrepreneur
 Léon Poliakov (1910–1997), French historian
 Maria Palyakova (born 1974), Ukrainian volleyball player
 Maria Polyakova (born 1997), Russian diver
 Mykola Polyakov (1946–2020), Ukrainian scientist
 Oleg Polyakov (born 1990), Russian footballer
 Samuel Polyakov (1837–1888), Russian businessman
 Sergei Polyakov (born 1968), Russian sport shooter
 Sergey Polyakov (born 1951), Russian-American scientist
 Valeri Polyakov (1942–2022), Russian cosmonaut
 Veronika Polyakova (born 1999), Russian rhythmic gymnast
 Viktor Polyakov (born 1981), Ukrainian boxer
 Vladimir Polyakov (pole vaulter) (born 1960), Soviet/Russian pole vaulter
 Vladislav Polyakov (born 1983), Kazakhstani swimmer
 Yevgeni Viktorovich Polyakov (born 1980), Russian footballer
 Yevgeniya Polyakova (born 1983), Russian sprinter
 Yisrael Poliyakov (1941–2007), Israeli comedian and actor
  (born 1977), Israeli actress, comedian, and screenwriter
 Yuriy Polyakov (born 1980), Russian-American scientist
 
 Samuel Polyakov (1837–1888), Russian businessman
 Lazar Polyakov (1843–1914), Russian-Jewish entrepreneur
  (1832–1909), Russian financier, entrepreneur, and merchant

See also
 

Russian-language surnames
Ukrainian-language surnames
Jewish surnames
Ethnonymic surnames